Synty ('origin, birth, aetiology', pl. synnyt) is an important concept in Finnish mythology. Syntysanat ('origin-words') or syntyloitsut ('origin-charms') provide an explanatory, mythical account of the origin of a phenomenon (such as an illness), material (such as iron), or species (such as a bear), and were an important part of traditional Finno-Karelian culture, particularly in healing rituals. Although much in the Finnish traditional charms is paralleled elsewhere, 'the role of aetiological and cosmogonic myths' in Finnic tradition 'appears exceptional in Eurasia'. The major study remains that by Kaarle Krohn, published in 1917.

Meanings of synty

The term synty is used in this article and in a range of scholarship as a genre-label, but it had a wide variety of meanings. Synty transparently derives from syntyä (‘come into existence, be born’) and means ‘birth’, ‘origin’, ‘aetiology’, and so forth. Its meanings can be literal and mundane (e.g. 'birth'), but it was also used in traditional poetry with a range of more numinous meanings, varying according to region, genre, and time. Thus in Kalevalaic poetry, synty can also denote the mystical power of a tietäjä (in which context it has been argued to refer to the origin of a tietäjä’s own powers and is more or less a synonym for the more frequent term luonto, perhaps being translated as 'fundamental essence'); it can be a synonym for 'god' or 'creator' (in the singular only, often in the collocation suuri synty, ‘great synty’); or it can denote other divine power whose source was more abstract.

In Karelian lament poetry, the plural synnyt and more especially its diminutive dialect form syntyiset (usually given in the Karelian form syndyzet) were important terms, found used of divine powers, the abode of the dead, the dead themselves, and even icons. It has been suggested that these usages are a loan-translation from Russian rod ('family') and roditeli ('parents'), which are used in similar ways and have an etymological connection with birth.

The term synty is used with varying degrees of specificity to denote poems within a wider body of Finnic incantations, a poem within which might also be referred to as a 'formulas', luku ('passage'), sanat ('words'), or virsi ('verse').

Use of synty-poems

Knowing synnyt was a characteristic branch of knowledge for traditional healers, known as tietäjät. It was believed that knowing the origin of things made it possible to exercise control over them. Healing spells might, for example, include words like Kyllä tunnen syntymäsi ('indeed I know your origin').

It was long thought that synnyt were primarily recited as prefaces to charms much like a historiola, to make the charm itself more effective, perhaps as part of a process of diagnosis. More recent work, however, has suggested that, though often combined with other incantations, the synty element is in these cases usually central rather than preliminary, and not so much a diagnosis as a cure; their primary context of use seems instead to have been healing physical (as opposed to metaphysical) injuries and wounds where there was no illness agent (such as a witch) to conjure. Synnyt might also be used in, for example, hunting rituals.

There is some debate over in what contexts synnyt were recited and in what contexts they were sung (and whether it is meaningful to distinguish between these modes). It appears that synnyt were recited in Western Finland by the eighteenth century but might still have been sung in the seventeenth. There is some evidence for synnyt or similar genres being performed by pairs of singers in the manner of epic poems, but not much. The poems themselves, however, give singing a prominent role. The tradition of performing synnyt has been compared with the North Germanic tradition of galdr, where a clear distinction between singing and speaking may not be appropriate.

Early evidence

The synnyt mostly survive in nineteenth-century folklore collections. However, the earliest are attested in documents of the 1650s: the minutes of the parliament of Vaasa for 26 August 1657 record aetiological poems for iron and fire. On 30 June 1658, court records for Vaasa record an aetiological poem for a magical shot (pistos) and on 5 July the same year in Isokyrö for cancer, iron, and fire.

The earliest scholarly discussion of synnyt is in the fourth fascicule (published in 1778) of Henrik Gabriel Porthan's De poësi Fennica.

Synty next makes a significant appearance as a genre term in Christianus Erici Lencqvist's dissertation De superstitione veterum Fennorum theoretica et practica, published in 1782. Discussing the mythical figure Kaleva, Lencqvist mentioned Kaleva's sword, and noted that one mention of that appears ‘in his versibus ... quibus ortus serpentis mythice exponitur (Kärmen syndy)’ ('in these verses ... in which the origin of the serpent is mythically expounded (Kärmen synty)'), quoting the following lines with his Latin translation:

Soon after, Cristfried Ganander included an entry for synnyt in his Mythologia fennica, defining them thus: ‘Synnyt, Archæologier öfver elden, ormen, sten, alla trän; läses öfver skador och sår af vidskeplige' (‘Synnyt: ancient histories of fire, the snake, stone, all trees; spoken over injuries and wounds by the superstitious').

Example 

The most widely attested subject for synnyt, according to the Suomen kansan vanhat runot, is the origin of iron. One example of such a synty, as edited by Lönnrot and translated by Abercromby, is:

Topics of recorded synnyt

The Suomen kansan vanhat runot editions list around 131 topics for synty texts, 114 of them categorised as syntyloitsut ('synty-charms'), in a total of around 6900 individual records. Its categorisation of charms is based on a F. A. Hästesko's 1918 study of the genre. The ten most popular subjects among the synnyt categorised in the SKVR as incantations (loitsut) are, in declining order, rauta ('iron', 862 examples), käärme ('snake', 714), tuli ('fire', 690), niukahdus ('sprain', 539), käärmeen purema ('snakebite', 290), pistos ('stabbing pain', 260), puu ('tree', 219), koi ('cancer', 180), voide ('ointment', 175), ähky ('colic', 137), riisi ('rickets', 135), läävämato (literally 'cowshed-snake', 125), and löyly ('sauna steam', 108).

Of the other categories of synnyt, the most important are those classified as epic texts, pre-eminently the maailma ('world', 455) and kantele (371). These overall patterns of popularity are consistent with the earliest attested synnyt, recorded in trial-records from Ostrobothnia in the 1650s (where the synty tradition had been lost by the nineteenth century): these are all on topics which were later in the top ten (cancer, stabbing pain, fire, and iron).

The following table lists all the SKVR topics of synnyt.

Elias Lönnrot's 1880 edition selects synnyt on the following fifty-one topics:

Literary adaptations

Literary adaptations of the synnyt appear in the Kalevala, for example the origin of oak and arrows in Runo II, flax in Runo IV, iron in Runo IX (an account which influenced oral tradition in turn), and the serpent in Runo XXVI.

Editions and translations

The first substantial, scholarly collection of synty poems was Suomen kansan muinaisia loitsurunoja, ed. by Elias Lönnrot (Helsinki: Suomen Kirjallisuuden Seura, 1880), http://www.gutenberg.org/ebooks/48751. A very large part of this was translated into English by John Abercromby, The pre- and proto-historic Finns, both Eastern and Western: with the magic songs of the west Finns, Grimm Library, 9-10, 2 vols (London: Nutt, 1898), vol. 1, vol. 1, vol. 2, vol. 2. Lönnrot adapted his sources extensively, however, such that this edition should be viewed, like the Kalevala, more as a literary work by Lönnrot than as a direct representation of oral traditions.

Further texts, closely representing the field records of folklore collectors, were published in the Suomen kansan vanhat runot series.

References

Finnish literature
Scandinavian folklore
Kalevala
Finnish mythology
Literary genres
Karelian-Finnish folklore